Andrew Phillip Cunanan (August 31, 1969 – July 23, 1997) was an American spree killer who murdered five people over three months from April 27 to July 15, 1997. His victims include Italian fashion designer Gianni Versace and Chicago real estate developer Lee Miglin. Cunanan died by suicide on July 23, 1997, eight days after murdering Versace.

Early life and education
The youngest of four children, Andrew Phillip Cunanan was born August 31, 1969, in National City, California, to Modesto "Pete" Dungao Cunanan (1930-2005), a Filipino-American, and Mary Anne Schillaci (1938-2012), an Italian-American. Modesto was serving in the United States Navy in the Vietnam War at the time of his son's birth. After leaving the Navy, where he had served as a chief petty officer, Modesto worked as a stockbroker.

In his youth, Cunanan lived with his family in National City and attended Bonita Vista Middle School. In 1981, his father enrolled him in The Bishop's School, an independent day school located in the affluent La Jolla neighborhood of San Diego. There Cunanan met his lifelong best friend, Elizabeth "Liz" Cote.
At school, he was remembered as being bright and very talkative, and testing with an IQ of 147.

As a teenager, Cunanan developed a reputation as a prolific liar, given to telling tall tales about his family and personal life. He was adept at changing his appearance according to what he felt was most attractive at a given moment. Cunanan identified as gay in high school, when he began having liaisons with wealthy older men. He was voted "least likely to be forgotten." After graduating from high school in 1987, Cunanan enrolled at the University of California, San Diego (UC San Diego), where he majored in American history.

In 1988, when Cunanan was 19, his father deserted his family and moved to the Philippines to evade arrest for embezzlement. That same year, Cunanan had begun frequenting local gay clubs and restaurants, and his mother, who was deeply religious, learned about his sexual orientation. During an argument, Cunanan threw his mother against a wall, dislocating her shoulder. Later examination of his behavior indicates that he may have suffered from antisocial personality disorder, characterized by a lack of remorse and empathy. In 1989, Cunanan dropped out of UC San Diego and settled in the Castro District of San Francisco, a center of gay culture, moving in with Cote and her boyfriend, Phil Merrill.

Adult life

In San Francisco, Cunanan continued his practice of befriending wealthy older men, and also reportedly began creating violent pornography. He also socialized in the Hillcrest and La Jolla neighborhoods of San Diego, as well as in Scottsdale, Arizona, "apparently living off the largesse of one wealthy patron or another." Cunanan is also believed to have been dealing drugs, including prescription opioids, cocaine, and marijuana. He used several aliases: Andrew DeSilva, Lt. Cmdr. Andy Cummings, Drew Cunningham, and Curt Matthew Demaris.

Cunanan allegedly first met fashion designer Gianni Versace in San Francisco in October 1990, when Versace was in town to fit the costumes he had designed for the San Francisco Opera production of Richard Strauss's opera Capriccio, although Versace's family has always denied that the two men ever met. In December 1995, Cunanan met David Madson, a Minneapolis architect, in a San Francisco bar. They began a long-distance relationship shortly after, but Madson ended the relationship in the spring of 1996, telling friends he sensed something "shady" about Cunanan. Cunanan told friends that Madson was the "love of my life".

In September 1996, Cunanan broke up with Norman Blachford, a wealthy older man who had been hosting and financially supporting him. He soon maxed out his credit cards. Cunanan's close friend Jeffrey "Jeff" Trail, a former Naval officer working as a district manager for a propane delivery company in Minneapolis, had told his former roommate Michael Williams that Cunanan had resumed selling drugs. Cunanan also was known to regularly consume these drugs, especially methamphetamine.

By April 1997, friends reported Cunanan was abusing painkillers and was drinking alcohol "like there was no tomorrow". Later that month, he told friends he was leaving San Diego for Minneapolis to "take care of some business matters" with Trail, who had recently distanced himself from Cunanan. Trail expected Cunanan to return to San Francisco upon leaving Minneapolis. Before Cunanan's visit, Trail told his sister that he "did not want Andrew to come." A week before his death, Trail told Williams that he had had a "huge falling out" with Cunanan and said, "I made a lot of enemies this weekend... I've got to get out of here. They're going to kill me."

On April 24, Cunanan and four friends attended a going-away party at Hillcrest's California Cuisine, a rare occasion when Cunanan did not cover the tab. He had reached the credit limit on both his credit cards, and had to ask for a credit extension to afford his plane ticket to Minneapolis. Upon arriving there the next day, Cunanan stayed with Madson, a mutual friend of his and Trail's, in Madson's apartment. That night, Cunanan and Madson dined at Nye's Restaurant and visited The Gay 90's nightclub. On April 26, Cunanan stayed in Trail's apartment while Trail was out of town with his boyfriend, Jon Hackett. The following afternoon, Trail told Hackett that he needed to have a "pretty important" conversation with Cunanan. When Trail and Hackett later returned to the apartment, there was no sign of Cunanan or his belongings. Trail left his apartment to see Cunanan shortly after 9 p.m. and was likely let into Madson's apartment at 9:45 p.m.

Murders

Jeffrey Trail
Cunanan's killings began in Minneapolis on April 26, 1997, with the murder of his friend, 28-year-old Jeffrey Trail. After an earlier argument in Trail's apartment, Cunanan stole Trail's gun and took it to David Madson's loft apartment. Cunanan rang Trail from Madson's apartment to come and retrieve his gun. On arrival Cunanan beat Trail to death with a hammer in front of Madson. On April 29, one of Madson's coworkers, concerned about his absence from work, visited his apartment to check on him and discovered Trail's body rolled in a rug and placed behind a sofa. Trail's watch had stopped at 9:55pm, believed by authorities to be the time of the killing.

David Madson
Madson, 33, was Cunanan's second victim. Authorities believe Madson remained in his apartment with Cunanan two days after Trail's murder, as one neighbor witnessed both men in the apartment elevator on April 28, and another neighbor witnessed the pair walking Madson's dog on April 29. Investigators then treated Madson as a suspect in Trail's murder, but Madson's family insisted he was held hostage by Cunanan. On May 2, Madson and Cunanan were seen north of Minneapolis, driving in Madson's Jeep and eating lunch together in a bar. The following morning, Madson's body was found on the east shore of Rush Lake near Rush City, Minnesota, with gunshot wounds to the head and back from a .40-caliber Taurus PT100 semi-automatic pistol Cunanan had taken from Trail's home.

Lee Miglin
On May 3, Cunanan drove to Chicago, Illinois, and killed 72-year-old Lee Miglin, a prominent real estate developer. He bound Miglin's hands and feet and wrapped his head with duct tape, then stabbed him more than twenty times with a screwdriver, slit his throat with a hacksaw, and stole his car. Miglin's family maintain that the killing was random, but former FBI agent Gregg McCrary argues it is unlikely that Cunanan would have bound and tortured Miglin without some motive.

Investigators noted Miglin's 1994 green Lexus LS sedan was missing from his garage and found Madson's red Jeep parked on the street near Miglin's house. Miglin's Lexus was equipped with a car phone, which, according to records, was activated on May 4 in Union County, Pennsylvania. Authorities began monitoring the phone's activity and found it was also activated on May 8 in Philadelphia and on May 9 near Penns Grove and Carneys Point Township, New Jersey.

William Reese
On May 9, in Pennsville Township, New Jersey, at Finn's Point National Cemetery, Cunanan shot and killed 45-year-old cemetery caretaker William Reese. Later that day, when Reese did not return home for dinner, his wife visited the cemetery to check on him and found the caretaker's office door ajar with the radio playing inside. She then called the police, who found Reese shot in the head by the same Taurus pistol Cunanan used to murder Madson. Unlike Cunanan's other victims, whom he killed for seemingly personal reasons, authorities believe Cunanan murdered Reese simply for his 1995 red Chevrolet pickup truck. Cunanan used this truck to drive to Florida.

On May 12, Cunanan began staying at the Normandy Plaza Hotel in Miami Beach, Florida, where he paid $29 per night in cash. On June 12, he was listed on the FBI Ten Most Wanted Fugitives list. While the manhunt unsuccessfully focused on Reese's stolen truck that Cunanan was using, he "hid in plain sight" for two months. Cunanan used his own name to pawn a stolen item on July 7, despite knowing that police routinely reviewed pawn shop records. On July 14, seemingly out of money, Cunanan checked out of his hotel without paying for his last night there.

Gianni Versace
Around 8:45am on July 15, 1997, Cunanan murdered 50-year-old Gianni Versace on the front steps of Casa Casuarina, his mansion in Miami Beach. Versace was returning from a visit to the News Cafe, where he picked up magazines, when he was shot once in the back of the head and once in the left cheek with the same Taurus pistol Cunanan used to murder Madson and Reese. A witness pursued Cunanan but was unable to catch him as he fled into a nearby parking garage. Versace was pronounced dead at Jackson Memorial Hospital at 9:21am.

Responding police found Reese's stolen vehicle in a nearby parking garage. It contained Cunanan's clothes and clippings of newspaper reports about the earlier murders.

Suicide
On July 23, 1997, Cunanan's body was found in a luxury houseboat in Miami Beach, after a caretaker reported to police of hearing a gunshot. He had shot himself in the head with the Taurus pistol stolen from Trail; it was the same weapon he used to kill Madson, Reese, and Versace.

Cunanan's cremated remains are interred in the mausoleum at Holy Cross Cemetery in San Diego.

Motive
Cunanan's motivation remains unknown; at the time of the murders there was extensive public and press speculation linking the crimes to Cunanan's alleged discovery that he was HIV positive, although an autopsy revealed he was HIV negative.

Although police searched the houseboat where Cunanan died, he left no suicide note and few personal belongings. Investigators noted Cunanan's reputation for acquiring money and expensive possessions from wealthy older men. Police considered few of the findings to be of note, except multiple tubes of hydrocortisone cream and a fairly extensive collection of fiction by C. S. Lewis.

In popular culture 
Cunanan was portrayed by Shane Perdue in the film The Versace Murder (1998), Jonathan Trent in the film Murder in Fashion (2009), Luke Morrison in the television film House of Versace (2013), and Darren Criss (who won an Emmy Award for his performance) in The Assassination of Gianni Versace (2018), the second season of the television series American Crime Story. Cunanan has been used in songs by Shyne ("Bad Boyz", 2000) and Modest Mouse ("Pistol (A. Cunanan, Miami, FL. 1996)", 2015)

He has also been the subject of several true crime television series' episodes: Mugshots on Court TV, with "Andrew Cunanan – The Versace Killer", and Six Degrees of Murder, with "The Body in the Rug". He has also been featured on ABC's news television series 20/20, and Investigation Discovery's show Most Evil in various episodes, where he is examined by Columbia University forensic psychiatrist Michael H. Stone.

In a 2018 Saturday Night Live sketch featuring John Mulaney, he is mentioned as having portrayed the son in the fictional incest-themed sitcom from 1987, Switcheroo.

See also 
 List of serial killers in the United States

Notes

References

Further reading

External links
 
 Andrew Cunanan's FBI file

1969 births
1997 deaths
1997 murders in the United States
20th-century American criminals
American male criminals
American male prostitutes
American spree killers
American people of Filipino descent
American people of Kapampangan descent
American people of Italian descent
FBI Ten Most Wanted Fugitives
Fugitives
American gay men
American LGBT people of Asian descent
LGBT people from California
Male serial killers
Murder–suicides in Florida
People from Chula Vista, California
People from National City, California
People from San Diego
People with antisocial personality disorder
1997 suicides
Suicides by firearm in Florida
University of California, San Diego alumni
Violence against men in North America
Violence against gay men in the United States